Port Davey is an oceanic inlet located in the south west region of Tasmania, Australia.

Port Davey was named in honour of Thomas Davey, a former Governor of Tasmania. Port Davey is contained within the Port Davey/Bathurst Harbour Marine Nature Reserve, the Melaleuca to Birchs Inlet Important Bird Area and the Southwest National Park, part of the Tasmanian Wilderness World Heritage Area. The Toogee name of the port is Poynduc.

Location and features

Port Davey lies between the Southern Ocean and Bathurst Harbour, which is linked by the Bathurst Channel.  The inlet leads north into Payne Bay, fed by the Davey River, with Payne Bay being defined by the features of Davey Head to the west, and Mount Berry to the east. The eastern aspect from Joe Page Bay to Bathurst Harbour is sheltered from the Roaring Forties that buffet the south and west coasts of Tasmania by a narrow part of the inlet that effectively makes the land to the south a peninsula.  The north–south ranges on the peninsula's South West Cape Range and Melaleuca Range lie to the west of the Southwest Conservation Area which is a section of land excluded from the Southwest National Park that exists between Melaleuca Inlet on the south side of Bathurst Harbour and Cox Bight on the south coast.

It is the penultimate waypoint on the western part of the South Coast Walking Track that is also known as South Coast and Port Davey Tracks.

Port Davey is not populated, but for many years Deny King and family resided at Melaleuca, engaged in alluvial tin mining. Since the death of Deny 
King in 1991, the family retain a leasehold within the national park and are actively involved in conservation programs but are not permanently resident.

History
The French navigator Marion du Fresne was the first European to record the inlet now called Port Davey, in March 1772. On 13 December 1798, when Flinders was off the West Coast, he mentioned Marion's small chart of the area, and tried to take the Norfolk in closer to investigate the opening marked on Marion's chart. That opening was clearly marked on Flinders' first map of "Van Diemen's Land" Published in 1800. James Kelly has always been seen as the first to discover Port Davey; however, Kelly would have seen Flinders' maps and may have had them with him.

In the 1800s, a small piners (Huon pine lumberjacks) settlement and boatyard was located on Payne Bay on Port Davey's north. The settlement remained until the 1900s when the Huon Pine trade ceased. Another temporary settlement was located at Bramble Cove behind the Breaksea Islands to serve the whaling industry in the early 1800s. Whaling ships would enter Port Davey for wood, water and vegetables and to try-out captured whales in sheltered waters. There is also evidence shore-based whaling took place at Bramble Cove in the middle of the 19th century. Nothing remains of the site except for a few huon pine headstones from an old cemetery.

The Bathurst Harbour/Port Davey area was marked on early 1800s maps as being the site for a settlement named Bathurst. The exact location of the proposed settlement varied depending on the map. Locations included Bramble Cove, Joe Page Bay below Mount Mackenzie and the Rowitta Plains. By the Victorian era, cartographers discontinued marking the settlement along with others such as Montgomery south of the Spero River, Cracroft on the Arthur Plains and Huntley in the Upper Florentine Forests west of Mount Field National Park.

The pioneer aviator Francis McClean organized and led an expedition to Port Davey to observe the May 9, 1910 solar eclipse. They suffered almost continual rain, yet a bush fire came within  of destroying their instruments and built a concrete platform for their instruments on Hixson's point. However the weather obscured the eclipse on May 9.

In the late 1930s, the British Zionist League considered a number of other places where a Jewish homeland could be established. The Kimberley region in Australia was considered until the Curtin government (in office: 1941–1945) rejected the possibility. Later and with the support of the then Premier of Tasmania, Robert Cosgrove (in office from 1939), Critchley Parker proposed a Jewish settlement at Port Davey. Parker surveyed the area, but his death in 1942 put an end to the idea.

Catalina PBY 5 flying boat, serial number 292, VH-BDP was the first recorded civilian aircraft to land in Port Davey on the 8th July 1947, flown by John Fraser (ex RAAF pilot). It was one of 3 bought as war surplus from RAAF by J Botterill & Fraser, South Melbourne, Vic, intended to be used to carry freshly caught seafood from fishing boats in Port Davey to Adelaide, Melbourne and Sydney. Only VH-BDP commenced operations, but ceased in early 1948 and the aircraft were sold in May 1948.

Fishing boats Pacific Pride and Diane utilised Port Davey to catch seafood for sale in Hobart in 1947.

Climate

See also

Macquarie Harbour

References

Further reading
 
 
 
 
 

South West Tasmania
Bays of Tasmania
Important Bird Areas of Tasmania
Davey, Port
Articles containing video clips
Whaling stations in Australia